Honnedaga may refer to:
Honnedaga Lake, a lake in the state New York
Honnedaga Brook, a brook in the state New York